Olívia Torres Mansor (born 6 June 1994)  is a Brazilian actress and singer. She made her debut in television and her career at large as a child actress in Começar de Novo playing Marcinha.

Biography 
Trevisol started off her career at the age of 7 as a dancer. At 13 she performed in theatre.
In 2015, she portrayed Débora in the 7pm telenovela Totalmente Demais.

Filmography

Television

Film

References 

1994 births
Living people
Brazilian television actresses
Brazilian telenovela actresses
Brazilian film actresses
People from São José do Rio Preto